Santiago Bonavía (1695–1759) was an Italian architect and painter who was active in Spain during the 18th century.

Called in 1731 by King Philip V of Spain, Cardinal Infante Luis of Chinchón
commissioned him in 1739 the construction in Madrid of the Church of Sts. Justus and Pastor, today's Pontifical Basilica of Saint Michael.

Bonavia was member of the Real Academia de Bellas Artes de San Fernando since its creation by royal decree in 1744. He became director of the Architecture department in 1753.

List of works 
Pontifical Basilica of Saint Michael
Royal Palace of Aranjuez

References 
 G. KUBLER, Arquitectura en los siglos XVII y XVIII, en Ars Hispaniae, XIV, Madrid 1957.
 Tovar Martín, Virginia, "Santiago Bonavía en la obra del Palacio Real de Aranjuez", Anales y Boletín de la Real Academia de Bellas Artes de San Fernando, 85, p. 209-246, 1997.

1695 births
1759 deaths
18th-century Italian architects
18th-century Italian painters
Italian male painters
Architects from Lombardy
People from Piacenza
18th-century Italian male artists